This is a list of Kemco games. Of note, the video games in North America prior to 1992 were not published by Kemco themselves, but instead by their distributor Seika Corporation of Torrance, California, who used the label Kemco * Seika to market Kemco's titles in the region.

Console-based games

Original games

Ports, localizations, and licensed games

Digital games

2007
Alphadia (NTT DoCoMo Mobile Phone)

2008
Alphadia II (NTT DoCoMo Mobile Phone)
Orleans no Otome: Jeanne D'Arc no Monogatari (NTT DoCoMo Mobile Phone)
Sorcery Blade (WiiWare)

2009
Alphadia III (NTT DoCoMo Mobile Phone)
Ayakashigatari (NTT DoCoMo Mobile Phone)
Symphony of Eternity (NTT DoCoMo Mobile Phone)

2010
Alphadia IV (NTT DoCoMo Mobile Phone)
Dark Gate (NTT DoCoMo Mobile Phone)
Eve of the Genesis (NTT DoCoMo Mobile Phone)
Fantasy Chronicle (NTT DoCoMo Mobile Phone)
Symphony of Eternity (iOS & Android)

2011
Aeon Avenger (iOS & Android)
Alphadia (iOS & Android)
Alphadia V (NTT DoCoMo Mobile Phone)
CODE: Cerberus (Android)
Eve of the Genesis (iOS & Android)
Fantasy Chronicle (iOS & Android)
Grinsia (iOS & Android)
Machine Knight (iOS & Android)

2012
Bonds of the Skies (iOS, Android, PSVita)
Covenant of Solitude (iOS & Android)
End of Aspiration (iOS & Android)
Knight of the Earthends (iOS & Android)
Mystic Chronicles (iOS & Android)
Silver Nornir (iOS & Android)
Symphony of the Origin (iOS & Android)

2013
Ancient Phantasma (Android)
Band of Monsters (iOS & Android)
Chronus Arc (iOS & Android) 
Chrome Wolf (iOS & Android)
CRYSTAREINO: Mezameshi Yuusha to Suishou no Oukoku (iOS & Android)
Destiny Fantasia (iOS & Android)
D.M.L.C.: Death Match Love Comedy (Android)
Fanatic Earth (iOS & Android)
Infinite Dunamis (iOS & Android)
Izumo Rei no Chousahoukokucho: Tozasareta Negai (Android)
Justice Chronicles (Android)
Legend of Ixtona (iOS & Android) 
Legacy Code: Mahou Sekai no Tankyuusha (Android)
Link of Hearts (iOS & Android)
Rusted Emeth (iOS & Android)
Seinaru Kishi no Monogatari (Android)
Seven Sacred Beasts (Android)
Soul of Deva: The Saiyuki Fantasy (iOS & Android)
Soul Historica (iOS & Android)
Cross Hearts Acadia (Android & iOS)
Togabito no Senritsu (Wii U)

2014
Alphadia Genesis (Android)
Asdivine Hearts (iOS, Android and 3DS)
Dead Dragons (Android)
Fortuna Magus (iOS & Android)
Journey to Kreisia (Android)
Lefalsia no Genei (Android)
Shining Mars (Android)
Shelterra The Sky World (iOS & Android)
Tears Revolude (Android)
Revenant Saga (iOS, PS3, Android)
Eclipse of Illusion (Android & iOS)
Illusion of L'Phalcia (Android & iOS)
Fanatic Earth (Android)
Soul of Deva (Android)
Shelterra the sky world (Android)
Rusted Emeth (Android)

2015
Kamen Rider Drive (Android & iOS)
Alphadia Genesis (PC, iOS & Android)
Tears Revolude (PC, iOS & Android)
Asdivine Dios (iOS & Android)
Justice Chronicles (3DS, Android & iOS)
Legend of Ixtona (Android & iOS)
Blood of Calamity (Android & iOS)
Valkyria Soul (Android & ios)
Dark Seven (Android & iOS)
Revenant Dogma (Android & iOS)
Grace of Letoile (Android & iOS)
Seven Sacred Beasts (Android & iOS)

2016
Asdivine Cross  (Android & iOS)
Asdivine Menace (Android & iOS)
Antiquia Lost (Android & iOS)
Glorious Savior (Android & iOS)
Astral Frontier (Android & iOS)
Fairy Elements (Android & iOS)
Elio: A fantasy of light and darkness (Android & iOS)
Justice Chronicles (Android & iOS)

2017
Asdivine Cross (3DS)
Asdivine Hearts II (Android, iOS)
Legna Tactica (Android)
Onigo Hunter (Android, iOS)
Djinn Caster (Android, iOS, PC, Mac, PS4, PSVita, Wii U)
Revenant Saga (Android, iOS, PS Vita, PC, Nintendo Switch)
Antiquia Lost (Nintendo Switch, PS4, PSVita, PC)
Yōdanji (Android)

2018
Dragon Sinker (Nintendo 3DS, Nintendo Switch, PS4, PSVita)
Dragon Lapis (Nintendo 3DS, Nintendo Switch, iOS)
Machine Knight (Nintendo 3DS)
Heirs of the Kings (Android)
Revenant Dogma (Xbox One, Windows 10, PS4, PSVita)
Fernz Gate (Xbox One, Windows 10, Nintendo Switch)
Chronus Arc (Xbox One, Windows 10, Nintendo Switch, Android, iOS)
Wizards of Brandel (Android)
Fairy Elements (Android)
Onigo Hunter (Nintendo 3DS)
Asdivine Hearts II (Xbox One)
Marenian Tavern Story: Patty and the Hungry God (PlayStation 4, Nintendo Switch, Android, iOS)
Sephirothic Stories (Android, iOS)

2019
Seek Hearts (Android, iOS)
Asdivine Dios (Xbox One, PS4, Switch, PSVita)
Asdivine Hearts II (PS4, PSVita, Switch)
Revenant Saga (Xbox One)
Sephirothic Stories (PS4, PSVita, Switch, Xbox One)
Alvastia Chronicles (PS4, PSVita, Switch)
Dimension Cross (Android, iOS)
Legend of the Tetrarchs (Android, iOS, PS4, Switch, Xbox One, Steam)
Frane: Dragon Odyssey (PS4, PSVita, Switch, Xbox One)
Ambition Record (Android)
Asdivine Kamura (Android, iOS, PS4, Xbox One, Steam, Switch)
Monochrome Order (Android, Steam, Xbox One, PS4, Switch)
Innocent Revenger (Android)
Archlion Saga (Switch)
Illusion of L'Phalcia (PS4, PSVita, Switch, Xbox One)
Asdivine Menace (PS4, PSVita, Switch, Xbox One)
Everdark Tower (Switch)
Masou no Viator (Android, iOS)
Wizards of Brandel (PS4, PSVita, Switch, Xbox One)

2020
Dragon Sinker (Xbox One)
Monster Viator (Xbox One, PS4, iOS, Android, Switch)
Liege Dragon (Xbox One, PS4, iOS, Android, Switch)
Alphadia Genesis (Xbox One, PS4, Switch)
Miden Tower (Xbox One, PS4, iOS, Android, Switch)
Ruinverse (Xbox One, PC, Android, iOS)
Crystal Ortha (Xbox One, PS4, iOS, Android, Switch)
Dragon Lapis (Xbox One, PS4, Switch)
Coloured Quartet (Android)

2021
Raging Loop (Android, PC, PS4, Xbox One)
Blacksmith of the Sand Kingdom (Android, PC, iOS, PS4, Xbox One)
Asdivine Saga (Android, iOS, PC, PS4)
Ruinverse (Switch, PS4, PS5)
Asdivine Cross (Switch, PS4, Xbox One, Xbox Series X, PS5)
Chroma Quaternion (Android, iOS, PC, Xbox One, Xbox Series X, Switch)
Archetype Arcadia (Switch, PS4, PS5, PC, iOS, Android)

2022 
 RPGolf Legends (PC, Switch, PS4, Xbox One, PS5, Xbox Series X)
 Overrogue (PC, Switch, Android, iOS, PS4, Xbox One, Xbox Series X)
 Sword of Elpisia (PC, Switch, Android, iOS, PS4, PS5, Xbox One)
 Infinite Links (PC, Switch, Android, iOS, PS4, PS5, Xbox Series X)
 Dragon Prana (PC, Android, iOS, Xbox Series X)
 Gale of Windoria (PC, Switch, Android, iOS, PS4, Xbox Series X)
 Alphadia Neo (PC, Switch, Android, iOS, PS4, PS5, Xbox One, Xbox Series X)
 Jinshin (PC, Switch, Android, iOS, PS4, PS5, Xbox One, Xbox Series X)

2023 
 Isekai Rondo (Android, PC, Switch, iOS, PS5, Xbox Series X)

Canceled games
Déjà Vu II: Lost in Las Vegas (NES/Famicom)
The Arashi no Drift Rally: Ijoukishou o Tsuppashire
The Flintstones in Viva Rock Vegas (GameCube)
Daikatana
Taitou
Lobo
Untitled Disney Channel game (Xbox 360's Kinect)

References

Kemco